

Diuma (or Dwyna or Duma) was the first Bishop of Mercia in the Anglo-Saxon Kingdom of Mercia, during the Early Middle Ages.

All that is known of Diuma's life is contained in a short account in Bede's Ecclesiastical History of the English People.

Diuma was an Irishman, and was one of four priests, Cedd, Atta, Betti and Diuma, from the Kingdom of Northumbria, who accompanied the newly baptised Peada, son of Penda (King of Mercia) back to Mercia in 653. Peada became a Christian when he married Alhflaed, daughter of Oswiu, King of Northumbria. The priests were to introduce the Christian faith to the region.

After Penda's death, Diuma was consecrated a bishop by Finan. It is assumed that he established his see in Repton, but the exact boundaries of the bishopric are unclear. The Venerable Bede claimed that he was bishop of both the Middle Angles and the Mercians.

Diuma was consecrated after 655 but his death date is unknown. It would appear to have been not long after this, as he was succeeded as bishop by Ceollach, whose own successor, Trumhere, was named bishop around 658. Bede refers to his episcopate as having been fruitful but short, after which he died in a place called in-feppingum in the territory of the Middle Angles. This place has never been definitely identified.

In 669 the seat of the diocese was moved by a successor, Chad, to Lichfield.

An early eleventh century list of resting places of the saints, lists a certain Dioma who rests at Charlbury near the river Windrush, suggesting the presence of a later Anglosaxon cult of Diuma.

Citations

References

External links
 

650s deaths
7th-century Irish bishops
Anglo-Saxon bishops of Lichfield
Irish Roman Catholic missionaries
Burials in South East England
Irish expatriates in England
Year of birth unknown
Roman Catholic missionaries in England